The pancake batfish (Halieutichthys aculeatus) belongs to the batfish family Ogcocephalidae. Their distributrition includes western Atlantic, North Carolina, northern Gulf of Mexico to northern South America. They inhabit a subtropical, sandy, reef-associated, and 45–820 m deep environment.

They live on the bottom of the ocean, covered in sand. The fish are flat, resembling pancakes with a maximum size of ca. 10 cm. They feed on small snails, clams, crustaceans, scallops, worms, and occasionally on small fishes. Their eggs and larvae are pelagic and develop upon reaching the bottom.

Two new species of Halieutichthys batfish were discovered in the Gulf of Mexico in 2010, in the region directly affected by the Deepwater Horizon oil spill. The two species were named Halieutichthys intermedius and Halieutichthys bispinosus.

References

External links

 
 Halieutichthys intermedius, the Louisiana pancake batfish. (with photo) 

Ogcocephalidae
Fish of the Atlantic Ocean
Fish described in 1818